Warspite is a hamlet in Alberta, Canada within Smoky Lake County. It is located on Highway 28, between the Town of Smoky Lake and Village of Waskatenau.

The hamlet is located in Census Division No. 12 and in the federal riding of Westlock-St. Paul.

History 
The first post office was opened in 1914 as Smoky Lake Centre. It was renamed Warspite in 1916 for  after the Battle of Jutland.

Demographics 

See also 
List of communities in Alberta
List of former urban municipalities in Alberta
List of hamlets in Alberta

References 

Designated places in Alberta
Former villages in Alberta
Hamlets in Alberta
Smoky Lake County
Populated places disestablished in 2000